The Huadong Valley or Hualien–Taitung Valley, also known as East Rift Valley or the Longitudinal Valley, is a long and narrow valley located between the Central Mountain Range and the Coastal Mountain Range. It is also recognized as a plain area which stretches for about 180 kilometers near the eastern coast of Taiwan, passes from Hualien City at the north to Taitung City at the south. It was called  or simply Nakasendō during the era of Japanese rule.

The valley is believed to be part of the northern terminus of the Philippine Mobile Belt, a complex collection of tectonic plate fragments and volcanic intrusions.  There are three large river systems flowing through this valley, including the Hualien, Xiugulan and Beinan Rivers, all of which flow into the Pacific Ocean.

The Huadong Highway, a section of Provincial Highway No. 9, runs the entire length of the valley from north to south.

Gallery

See also
 Geology of Taiwan

References

External links
East Rift Valley National Scenic Area Administration

Valleys of Taiwan